DaRon Holmes II is an American college basketball player for the Dayton Flyers of the Atlantic 10 Conference.

Early life and high school
Holmes grew up in Goodyear, Arizona and initially attended Millennium High School. He was named the Arizona Gatorade Player of the Year after averaging 23.7 points, 10.6 rebounds, 3.8 blocks, and 3.1 assists per game as a junior. Holmes transferred to Montverde Academy in Montverde, Florida prior to the start of his senior year. He ultimately moved back to Arizona during his winter break and transferred a second time to AZ Compass Prep School in Chandler, Arizona. Holmes was rated a four-star recruit and committed to play college basketball at Dayton over offers from Arizona, Marquette, and California.

College career
Holmes started all 35 of the Dayton Flyers' games as a freshman and led the team with 12.8 points per game and also averaged 6.1 rebounds and 2.3 blocks per game. He also set a school record with 81 total blocks in a season. Holmes was named the Atlantic 10 Conference Rookie of the Year, second-team All-Atlantic 10, and to the conference All-Defense team.

Holmes entered his sophomore season on the watch list for the Karl Malone Award.

References

External links
Dayton Flyers bio

Year of birth missing (living people)
Living people
American men's basketball players
Basketball players from Arizona
Dayton Flyers men's basketball players
People from Maricopa County, Arizona
Power forwards (basketball)